The Stralsund Theatre in the German town of Stralsund has a long tradition. Performances of theatre pieces on the Alter Markt are documented in the years 1553 ("Tragedie van deme Daniel") and 1584 ("De Tragedien van Susannen"). The present building was designed by Carl Moritz and opened in 1914. The tradition has continued since the merger of the  theatres of the towns of Stralsund and Greifswald in 1994 into the Theatre of West Pomerania.

External links 

 Official web presence of theatres in West Pomerania
 Baltic Sea Festivals in Stralsund & Greifswald
 Conversion of Stralsund Theatre (photographs, construction history, drawings)

Stralsund
Theatre in Germany
Culture of Mecklenburg-Western Pomerania
Theatres completed in 1914